The Portuguese Swimming Federation ( is the national sports federation tasked with the development, promotion and international representation of swimming in Portugal. The federation overlooks several other sports including competition swimming, open water swimming, water polo, diving and synchronized swimming. The federation is based in Lisbon and Porto. It is a member of the Olympic Committee of Portugal, and represents roughly 11,000 members.

References

External links
  

Portugal
1930 establishments in Portugal
Swimming organizations
Swimming in Portugal
Swimming
Sports organizations established in 1930